Fifth Bridge is a bridge in the city of Mosul, located in the province of Nineveh Governorate in Iraq over the Tigris River. The bridge was constructed in the 1980s and links the east and west sides of the city.

During the Battle of Mosul in 2016, all bridges into the city were booby trapped with explosives by ISIL, which had occupied the city since June 2014. The bridge was destroyed by U.S. coalition airstrikes on 3 November 2016.

See also

References

Bridges in Iraq
Bridges over the Tigris River